The women's 4 x 100 metres relay at the 2014 European Athletics Championships took place at the Letzigrund on 16 and 17 August.

Medalists

Records

Schedule

Results

Round 1

Final

References

Qualifying Round Results
Final Results

Relay 4 x 100 W
Relays at the European Athletics Championships
2014 in women's athletics